Tomáš Berdych and Jan Hájek were the defending champions, but they decided not to participate this year.
Juan Mónaco and Rafael Nadal won the title, defeating Julian Knowle and Philipp Oswald in the final, 6–3, 6–4.

Seeds

Draw

Draw

References
Main draw

Doubles